Zoo of Brescia Castle was a Zoo in Brescia, Lombardy, northern Italy, created in the Castle of Brescia in 1913 and closed in 1988.

See also
 :it:Castello di Brescia (IT)

References 

Zoos in Italy
Parks in Lombardy
Zoos established in 1913
Zoos disestablished in 1988
Parks in Brescia
Former zoos
1913 establishments in Italy
1988 disestablishments in Italy